Gino Louis Torretta (born August 10, 1970) is a former American football quarterback who played in the National Football League (NFL) for five seasons. He played college football at the University of Miami, won the Heisman Trophy in 1992, and was a member of the Miami Hurricanes' national championship teams of 1989 and 1991. A seventh-round pick in the 1993 NFL Draft, he was a member of several NFL teams, but never became a regular starter as a pro. He was inducted into the College Football Hall of Fame in 2010.

Early years
Torretta was born in Pinole, California. He graduated from Pinole Valley High School, where he was a standout high school football quarterback for the Pinole Spartans.

College career
Torretta accepted an athletic scholarship to attend the University of Miami, where he played for the Miami Hurricanes football team from 1989 to 1992.

1989 and 1990 seasons

As a quarterback for the Hurricanes, Torretta spent his first two seasons mostly on the bench behind then starting quarterback Craig Erickson, with his only significant playing time coming with three starts in 1989 after Erickson injured his throwing hand. During that span, however, the then-unknown Torretta lit up San Diego State for 485 yards, setting a school record for most passing yards in a game that was only broken on September 29, 2012 by Stephen Morris.

Sebastian the Ibis incident
Prior to an October 28, 1989 game against long-standing rival Florida State at Doak Campbell Stadium in Tallahassee, University of Miami mascot Sebastian the Ibis was tackled by a group of police officers for attempting to put out Osceola and Renegade's flaming spear. Sebastian was wearing a fireman’s helmet and yellow raincoat and holding a fire extinguisher. When a police officer attempted to grab the fire extinguisher, the officer was sprayed in the chest. Sebastian was handcuffed by four officers and detained but ultimately released. Torretta, who started that game for Miami, later told ESPN, "Even if we weren't bad boys, it added to the mystique that, 'Man, look, even their mascot's getting arrested.'"

1991 season

In his first year as a starter, Torretta garnered further attention by stealing the show in a nationally televised 1991 game versus the Houston Cougars and their Heisman-frontrunning quarterback, David Klingler. As Miami's defense cut down Houston's run-and-shoot offense, Torretta put on the performance that many expected out of Klingler en route to a 40–10 victory; Klingler's lone touchdown pass in the game came with three seconds left in the fourth quarter against Miami's third-string defense, long after the game was decided.  Torretta went on to lead Miami to a fourth-quarter comeback win on the road versus #1 Florida State and ultimately to an undefeated season and a co-national championship.

1992 season

Torretta passed for more than 3,000 yards his senior year in 1992 on his way to winning the Heisman Trophy and the Davey O'Brien Award that season. He also won the Walter Camp Award, the Maxwell Award, the Johnny Unitas Trophy, and the Chic Harley Award. One of the key games of the season came against West Virginia when he threw for 363 yards and two touchdowns in the 35–23 victory. His career as quarterback at Miami was hugely successful, with Torretta leading the team to 26 wins and only one loss, which came in the 1993 Sugar Bowl where the Hurricanes were dominated by the Alabama Crimson Tide's defense. Torretta was flummoxed by Alabama's 11-man fronts, and threw three interceptions after only throwing four all season. Alabama won the game, 34–13, and the national championship.

Statistics

NFL career

1993–1994
Despite his collegiate-level success, Torretta was not a top NFL draft pick, and his NFL career was fairly unremarkable. He was not selected until the Minnesota Vikings took him in the seventh round in the 1993 NFL draft and then did not play him at all that year. In 1994, Torretta was on the Vikings' roster, and then was picked up by the Detroit Lions. As was the case in 1993, he failed to play at all in 1994, serving the entire season in a backup role with the Lions.

1995–1999
In 1995, Torretta moved to NFL Europe and was also on the roster for the San Francisco 49ers and Detroit Lions but was again relegated to backup roles. He was cut by the 49ers in 1996 and subsequently picked up by the Seattle Seahawks. His only chance to play in an NFL game came in the 1996 season finale when he came off the bench for the Seahawks against the Oakland Raiders. He immediately threw a 32-yard touchdown pass to Joey Galloway that put Seattle ahead, leading the team to victory.

In 1997, Torretta was on the roster for Seattle and later the Indianapolis Colts but again did not play. After a brief stint with Kansas City in 1999, he retired from the NFL.

Post-NFL career
Torretta followed his NFL career with a position at Wachovia Securities as a senior financial advisor. He is chairman and CEO of Touchdown Radio, broadcasting an NCAA game of the week on national radio. He is also an NCAA football expert on Sirius XM channel 91, College Sports Nation.

Torretta is vice president for GAMCO Asset Management, working with institutional clients nationwide and working out of the firm's Palm Beach office.

References

External links
 
 
 
 

1970 births
Living people
All-American college football players
American football quarterbacks
American people of Italian descent
College football announcers
College Football Hall of Fame inductees
Detroit Lions players
Heisman Trophy winners
Indianapolis Colts players
Maxwell Award winners
Miami Hurricanes football players
Minnesota Vikings players
People from Pinole, California
Players of American football from California
Rhein Fire players
San Francisco 49ers players
Seattle Seahawks players
Sportspeople from the San Francisco Bay Area